Lysimachia maritima is a plant species belonging to the family Primulaceae. It was previously called Glaux maritima, the only species in the monotypic genus Glaux. The species has a number of common names, including sea milkwort, sea milkweed, and black saltwort.

Distribution and habitat 
Lysimachia maritima has a circumpolar distribution in the northern hemisphere and is native to Europe, central Asia and North America. The species grows mainly in coastal habitats in Europe but also occurs in mesic interior habitats in Asia and North America, in both wet ground and water. It is known from alkaline meadows in desert regions in Utah, at elevations of up to 2600 m (8500 ft).

Description 
This plant differs from all other genera of the Primulaceae in having apetalous flowers with a pink, petaloid calyx. It is generally pentamerous both in the calyx and the seed capsule. The leaves are fleshy, simple and opposite.

References

External links

Jepson Manual Treatment — Glaux maritima
Glaux maritima — Photo gallery

maritima
Flora of Europe
Flora of Canada
Flora of the Northeastern United States
Flora of the Western United States
Flora of California
Flora of Colorado
Flora of the Great Basin
Flora of New Mexico
Plants described in 1753
Taxa named by Carl Linnaeus
Flora without expected TNC conservation status